The enzyme dimethylpropiothetin dethiomethylase (EC 4.4.1.3) catalyzes the chemical reaction

S,S-dimethyl-β-propiothetin  dimethyl sulfide + acrylate

The enzyme breaks S,S-dimethyl-β-propiothetin into dimethyl sulfide and acrylate.

This enzyme belongs to the family of lyases, specifically the class of carbon-sulfur lyases.  The systematic name of this enzyme class is S,S-dimethyl-β-propiothetin dimethyl-sulfide-lyase (acrylate-forming). Other names in common use include desulfhydrase, and ''S,S''-dimethyl-beta-propiothetin dimethyl-sulfide-lyase.

References

 

EC 4.4.1
Enzymes of unknown structure